Wendell Anderson could refer to: 

Wendell Abraham Anderson (1840–1929), former Chairman of the Democratic Party of Wisconsin
Wendell R. Anderson (1933–2016), American hockey player, politician, and former governor of Minnesota